Mehdi Momeni Larimi is an Iranian footballer who currently plays for Machine Sazi in the Persian Gulf Pro League.

Club career
Momeni joined Foolad in 2010 after spending the previous year at Nassaji Mazandaran.

Club career statistics

 Assist Goals

References

External links 
 Mehdi Momeni at Persianleague.com
 Mehdi Momeni at PersianLeague.com 
 
 Mehdi Momeni 
 
 http://old.ffiri.ir/en/league/101/club/10020/Peykan-Tehran/mahdi-momeni-larijani/2b4837ef-307c-4056-be39-327ca91a2e66/player/
 

1985 births
Living people
Iranian footballers
Persian Gulf Pro League players
Foolad FC players
Saba players
Nassaji Mazandaran players
Esteghlal Khuzestan players
Esteghlal F.C. players
People from Qaem Shahr
Association football midfielders
Sportspeople from Mazandaran province